Streptomyces capitiformicae is a bacterium species from the genus of Streptomyces which has been isolated from the head of the ant Camponotus japonicus. Streptomyces capitiformicae produces angucyclinone-antibiotics.

See also 
 List of Streptomyces species

References 

capitiformicae
Bacteria described in 2018